Port Hardy Airport  is located  southeast of Port Hardy, British Columbia, Canada.

The airport is classified as an airport of entry by Nav Canada and is staffed by the Canada Border Services Agency (CBSA). CBSA officers at this airport can handle general aviation aircraft only, with no more than 15 passengers.

There are no Canada Border staff based at the Port Hardy Airport. A Canpass toll free number is available for CBSA service.

Airlines and destinations

History
The aerodrome was listed as "servicable - under construction" with three runways as follows:

See also
 List of airports on Vancouver Island

References

External links

.

Certified airports in British Columbia
Northern Vancouver Island
Regional District of Mount Waddington
Transport on Vancouver Island
Royal Canadian Air Force stations
Military airbases in British Columbia
Military history of British Columbia